Andamion Murataj  is a film director, screenwriter and producer living in New York, NY. He is best known for the screenplay of the feature film The Forgiveness of Blood, that he co-wrote with Joshua Marston, and after which won the Silver Bear for the Best Screenplay at the 2011 Berlin International Film Festival.

Biographical Information
With a background in painting and photography, Andamion Murataj's work spans over the years from writing and directing to cinematography and producing.

Upon his return to Albania, in 2010, he founded the Albanian Production Company "Lissus Media", that locally produced of the feature film “The Forgiveness of Blood”. In 2011 the film premiered in competition at the 61st Berlin International Film Festival.

Andamion Murataj is a founder and the director of Balkan Film Market, Albascript Workshops and often is a jury member in International Film Festivals. 

Andamion Murataj holds an MFA in Film and Electronic Media from American University in Washington DC.

Awards and Citations
Silver Bear, Best Screenplay for The Forgiveness of Blood, (shared with Joshua Marston)  2010 Berlin Film Festival
Silver Hugo, Best Screenplay for The Forgiveness of Blood, (shared with Joshua Marston) at Chicago International Film Festival. 
Best Pitch, Man of the House at Boat Meeting, International Film Festival Molodist. Kyiv, Ukraine,

References

Albanian film directors
Living people
Year of birth missing (living people)
People from Tirana
Silver Bear for Best Screenplay winners